Brutus is a Belgian rock band from Leuven, Flemish Brabant that plays post-hardcore.

History 
The members of Brutus got to know each other playing in different bands around Leuven. Stefanie (drums and vocals) and Peter (bass) played together in Refused Party Program, a Refused tribute band, while Stijn and Stefanie were in the band Starfucker.

In 2014 and 2015, Brutus played at various festivals, such as Pukkelpop, Rock Herk, and Dour Festival. In 2016, the band left for Vancouver to record their debut album with the help of Jesse Gander. Their debut album BURST was released by Hassle Records (EU) and Sargent House (US and worldwide). They released their second album Nest in 2019.
Brutus taking out live album on October 23, 2020 "Live in Ghent" (concert recording May 29, 2019 in Ghent, Belgium).

On July 28, 2022, Brutus announced their third album Unison Life via their Facebook page and also from Sargent House for October 21, 2022.

Band members 

 Stefanie Mannaerts – vocals, drums
 Stijn Vanhoegaerden – guitar
 Peter Mulders – bass

Discography

Album 

 Burst (2017)
 Nest (2019)
 Live In Ghent (2020)
 Unison Life (2022)

EPs 

 Brutu Guru (2015) - Split album with The Guru Guru.

Singles 

 "All Along" (2016)
 "Drive" (2017)
 "Horde II" (2017)
 "Justice de Julia II" (2018)
 "War" (2019)
 "Cemetery" (2019)
 "Django" (2019)
 "Sand" (2020)
 "Dust" (2022)
 "Liar" (2022)
 "Victoria" (2022)

References 

Belgian rock music groups